Tom Cruise is an American actor and producer. Risky Business (1983), garnered Cruise his first nomination for the Golden Globe Award for Best Actor – Motion Picture Musical or Comedy. In 1986, Cruise played a naval aviator in the Tony Scott-directed action drama Top Gun (the highest-grossing film that year), and also appeared with Paul Newman in the Martin Scorsese-directed drama The Color of Money. Two years later, he starred with Dustin Hoffman in the Academy Award for Best Picture-winning drama Rain Man (1988), and also appeared in the Golden Raspberry Award for Worst Picture-winning romantic drama Cocktail (1988). In doing so Cruise became the first and only person as of 2014 to star in a Best Picture Oscar winner and a Worst Picture Razzie winner in the same year. His next role was as anti-war activist Ron Kovic in the film adaptation of Kovic's memoir of the same name, Born on the Fourth of July (1989), for which he received the Golden Globe Award for Best Actor – Motion Picture Drama.

In 1992, he starred opposite Jack Nicholson in the legal drama A Few Good Men, an adaptation of the Broadway play of the same name also written by Aaron Sorkin. Cruise next appeared in The Firm (1993), a film adaptation of the John Grisham legal thriller of the same name, and in the same year also made his directorial debut by directing an episode of the anthology television series Fallen Angels. Cruise starred as spy Ethan Hunt in the action film Mission: Impossible (1996), the first project of his production company Cruise/Wagner Productions, which he had co-founded with Paula Wagner in 1993. As of 2018, Cruise has appeared in five more films in the Mission: Impossible franchise: Mission: Impossible 2 (2000), Mission: Impossible III (2006), Mission: Impossible – Ghost Protocol (2011), Mission: Impossible – Rogue Nation (2015), and Mission: Impossible – Fallout (2018).

He played the title role in the Cameron Crowe-directed comedy-drama Jerry Maguire (1996), which garnered Cruise the Golden Globe Award for Best Actor – Motion Picture Musical or Comedy. In 1999, Cruise starred in the Stanley Kubrick-directed erotic thriller Eyes Wide Shut opposite his then wife Nicole Kidman, and also appeared in the Paul Thomas Anderson-directed drama Magnolia. For the latter he received the Golden Globe Award for Best Supporting Actor – Motion Picture, and was also nominated for the Academy Award for Best Supporting Actor. Cruise reteamed with Crowe on the science fiction thriller Vanilla Sky (2001), which earned him a Saturn Award for Best Actor. The following year he starred in the Steven Spielberg-directed Minority Report (2002). In 2005, he collaborated again with Spielberg on War of the Worlds, and received the Stanley Kubrick Britannia Award for Excellence in Film from BAFTA Los Angeles. Three years later he appeared in the satirical action comedy Tropic Thunder and played German army officer Claus von Stauffenberg in the historical thriller Valkyrie (both in 2008). In 2010, Cruise reunited with his Vanilla Sky co-star Cameron Diaz in the action comedy Knight and Day, followed by the action thriller Jack Reacher (2012), in which he starred in the titular role and in its sequel Jack Reacher: Never Go Back (2016). He starred in Oblivion (2013), and Edge of Tomorrow (2014), both of which saw his return to the science fiction genre. Three years later, he played drug smuggler Barry Seal in the action comedy American Made (2017). In 2022, Cruise starred in and produced the action film sequel Top Gun: Maverick, which has grossed over $1.4 billion and became his highest-grossing film.

Film

Television

See also
 List of awards and nominations received by Tom Cruise

References

External links
 

Male actor filmographies
Filmography
American filmographies